Kari Ann Lake (born August 23, 1969) is an American former television news anchor and political figure who was the Republican nominee in the 2022 Arizona gubernatorial election.

Beginning her media career in the early 1990s, Lake was the anchor for the Phoenix television station KSAZ-TV from 1999 to 2021. She stepped down from her anchor role shortly before announcing her gubernatorial candidacy and won the Republican nomination with the endorsement of former president Donald Trump. Her campaign was marked by various controversies, including promoting false claims of Trump winning the 2020 presidential election and calling for the imprisonment of those who accepted Trump's defeat, including her Democratic opponent, Arizona Secretary of State Katie Hobbs. Lake lost the gubernatorial election to Hobbs, but refused to concede and filed a lawsuit in an attempt to have the results overturned and herself declared the winner. Two levels of Arizona's state courts ruled against Lake, but she has appealed to the Arizona Supreme Court.

Early life and education 
Lake was born in 1969, in Rock Island, Illinois, to Larry A. Lake, a teacher and coach of football and basketball, from Richland Center, Wisconsin, and Sheila A. Lake (née McGuire), a nurse from Appleton, Wisconsin. She is the youngest of nine children.

Lake grew up in Iowa. She graduated from North Scott Senior High School in Eldridge, Iowa, and then received a Bachelor of Arts in communications and journalism from the University of Iowa.

Media career
In May 1991, Lake began working at KWQC-TV in Davenport, Iowa, as an intern while attending the University of Iowa. She later became production assistant before joining WHBF-TV in Rock Island, Illinois, to be a daily reporter and weekend weathercaster in 1992. In August 1994, Lake was hired by KPNX in Phoenix, Arizona, to be the weekend weather anchor. She later became evening anchor at KPNX before relocating to work for WNYT in Albany, New York, in the summer of 1998, when she replaced Chris Kapostasy.

Lake returned to Arizona in 1999 and became an evening anchor for KSAZ-TV (Fox 10 Phoenix). While at KSAZ, Lake interviewed President Barack Obama in 2016 and President Donald Trump in 2020.

In her last years working in the media, Lake shared false and unverified information on social media, prompting criticism and acquiring a reputation as a provocateur. In 2018, she opposed the Red for Ed movement, which sought more funding for education through strikes and protests, claiming that movement was a "big push to legalize pot"; she later apologized for the statement (saying that she "made an incorrect conclusion") and, according to the station's regional human resources director, subsequently took an unexpected month-long leave from her position at the station. In July 2019, Lake was caught on "hot mic" footage promoting her account on the web platform Parler. She shared COVID-19 misinformation on Twitter and Facebook in April 2020. Lake's statements and actions made her a divisive figure among colleagues in her last years at the station.

In March 2021, she announced her departure from KSAZ, one day after FTVLive, a television news industry site, published a video clip of Lake at the Conservative Political Action Conference (CPAC) in Orlando; the website questioned whether Lake was there as a journalist or as a member of a movement. In June 2021, she announced her campaign for governor.

Political career

Party switches

Lake was a member of the Republican Party until November 3, 2006, when she changed her registration to become an independent. She registered as a Democrat on January 4, 2008, the day after the Iowa Democratic presidential caucuses were won by Obama. Lake returned to being a Republican on January 31, 2012. She explained leaving the Republican Party in 2006 as a reaction to the then-ongoing Iraq and Afghanistan wars. She had supported John Kerry in 2004 and Barack Obama in 2008. She also made several donations to Democratic presidential candidates.  After launching her campaign for governor in 2021, Lake cited Trump, Ronald Reagan, and Arizona Republican Party chair Kelli Ward, all former Democrats, as precedent for her party-switching.

2022 gubernatorial run

Lake filed paperwork in June 2021 to seek the Republican nomination for governor of Arizona in the 2022 election to succeed incumbent governor Doug Ducey, who is term-limited. Four candidates sought the Republican nomination: Lake; former real estate developer and Arizona Board of Regents member Karrin Taylor Robson; Paola Tulliani Zen, and Scott Neely. Lake and Robson were the front-runners, leading in polling and fundraising. A fifth Republican candidate, ex-congressman Matt Salmon, dropped out of the race after trailing in polls and endorsed Robson.

Throughout her campaign, Lake was described as "a champion of the far-right" movement in the United States. Lake received Donald Trump's endorsement in September 2021. The primary was seen as a "battle" between Republicans aligned with Trump and establishment Republicans. Robson was supported by figures such as former Vice President Mike Pence, governor Ducey, and former New Jersey governor Chris Christie. By the end of 2021, Lake had raised $1.4 million from 12,000 sources. Lake centered her campaign on promoting the false claim that the 2020 presidential election in Arizona and nationwide was "rigged and stolen"; Boris Epshteyn, a former Trump White House aide who promoted Trump's efforts to overturn the election results, attributed her victory in the Republican primary, despite being "outspent 10-to-1," to that stance. Lake won the Republican primary in Arizona on August 2, 2022, winning in all counties.

After winning the Republican primary, Lake said that "we're all big boys and big girls", urging people to "come together"; however, within a week of that victory, Lake said: "We drove a stake through the heart of the McCain machine". Later in early November, Lake participated in a campaign event where she told "McCain Republicans" to "get the hell out!" Lake also called the traditional Republican party as "the party of McCain", and then stated: "Boy, Arizona has delivered some losers, haven't they?" Her statements were in contrast to her past description of John McCain (Arizona's former Republican Senator) four years earlier, after his death, as "courageous", "a war hero, icon and a force to be reckoned with".

Democratic gubernatorial candidate Katie Hobbs refused to debate Lake during the election. However, both attended a gubernatorial candidate forum in September 2022, held by the Arizona Chamber of Commerce and Industry, where they separately answered questions.

COVID-19
In August 2021, during the COVID-19 pandemic, Lake led anti-mask rallies, calling on Arizona State University students to go against the university's mask mandates. Lake said that as governor she would not tolerate mask and vaccine mandates of the COVID-19 pandemic. In November 2021, Lake told a group of Republican retirees that she was taking hydroxychloroquine to prevent COVID-19 infection. She stated that, as governor, she would work to have hydroxychloroquine and ivermectin produced in the state to "make it easier for us to get these lifesaving drugs". Lake questioned the science behind COVID-19 vaccines and said that she had not been vaccinated.

Political positions
Lake identifies as a conservative Republican and described herself in 2022 as a "Trump candidate." During her 2022 gubernatorial campaign, she attracted support from right-wing extremists. She accused President Joe Biden and Democrats of harboring a "demonic agenda". In 2021 and 2022, Lake attended the Conservative Political Action Conference (CPAC), an annual meeting of conservatives and Republicans, in Orlando.

Lake said in 2022 that she considers abortion to be "the ultimate sin" and praised the Supreme Court decision in Dobbs v. Jackson Women's Health Organization, which held that there was no federal right to abortion under the U.S. Constitution, and overturned Roe v. Wade. She expressed support for banning both surgical abortions and medication abortions in Arizona. In an op-ed for the Independent Journal Review, Lake wrote that as governor she would deport illegal immigrants that enter Arizona without seeking federal approval and complete unfinished portions of the Trump wall on the Mexico–United States border.

Lake has opposed legislation to create non-discrimination protections for people based on sexual orientation and gender identity, and opposing restrooms accommodating transgender people. She has referred to LGBTQ rights and people as being a part of the "alphabet mafia". Lake claimed that she and "and most of my gay friends are appalled with the 'BTQ+' [bisexual, transgender, and queer plus] everything they keep adding to it." She has criticized drag queens as being potentially harmful to children despite having attended and supported drag queen events herself. After her election loss, she was listed as an honoree and presenter at Mar-a-Lago for the December 15, 2022 "Spirit of Lincoln Gala," an event held by the Log Cabin Republicans, a political action committee for LGBTQ Republicans.

In an interview with 60 Minutes Australia journalist Liam Bartlett, Lake asserted that Australians "have no freedom" due to strict Australian gun laws; in a tweet four months later, Lake said that if elected governor, she would not "recognize" federal gun laws.

Promotion of stolen election claims
Lake had been a leading proponent of the false claim that the 2020 presidential election was "stolen" from Trump. During her campaign, she aligned herself with Trump and centered her candidacy on promoting election lies.

Lake claimed President Joe Biden did not receive 81 million votes and that Arizona (which was won by Biden in the 2020 presidential election) was actually won by Trump. After the 2021 Maricopa County presidential ballot audit found no evidence of election fraud, she demanded the election be "decertified"—a legal impossibility, as such a process does not exist. She endorsed a false assertion by Trump spokeswoman Liz Harrington that Democrats use mail-in ballots to rig elections, even though Trump himself was a vote-by-mail permanent absentee voter in Florida while serving as president. Lake tweeted quotes made by Sidney Powell on Lou Dobbs Tonight falsely asserting there was a sweeping election fraud conspiracy. She has advocated imprisoning Arizona Secretary of State Katie Hobbs, her Democratic opponent in the gubernatorial race, on baseless and unspecified allegations of criminality related to the 2020 election. Lake also called for imprisoning journalists. Lake repeatedly claimed that defendants arrested in connection with the January 6 United States Capitol attack were "being held in prison without being charged".

Trump endorsed Lake's candidacy, as did pro-Trump Republican figures such as Arizona congressman Paul Gosar and former National Security Advisor Michael Flynn. By contrast, Lake's main primary opponent, Robson, was endorsed by outgoing Republican governor Doug Ducey, as well as Arizona Senate president Karen Fann and Americans for Prosperity. Lake attacked Robson for failing to endorse false claims of election fraud. Lake attended events headed by My Pillow founder Mike Lindell, a prominent promoter of false claims regarding fraud in the 2020 election. During her 2021 campaign for governor, she said that she would not have certified Biden's 2020 election victory in Arizona if she had been governor at the time. During a June 2022 debate among candidates for the Republican nomination, Lake continued to insist the 2020 presidential election was "stolen" and "corrupt".

Fox News reported in July 2022 that nine days before the 2017 Inauguration of Donald Trump, Lake had posted a meme on Facebook that declared the inauguration a "national day of mourning and protest", in which she asked her followers how they would react to Trump's inauguration. She asked "Will you be protesting the inauguration?" and how they might protest. The post was deleted after Fox News asked Lake's campaign about it.

In February 2023, Lake said: "We've got great candidates on the Republican Party and on our side. We've got so many great candidates that if our elections were really fair, I believe the ranks of Congress, the Senate, I think a White House, I think all the state governorships would be Republican if elections were fair".

Dispute with Rick Stevens
After Lake posted remarks critical of drag queens performing in front of children, Rick Stevens, who performs professionally under the name Barbra Seville, published photos and text messages purportedly demonstrating a professional relationship and personal friendship with Lake. Stevens said that he has performed at Lake's home and in front of Lake's then "9 or 10 years old" daughter at Lake's invitation. Lake described Stevens' allegations as "defamatory lies", specifically denying they had been friends and denying that he had ever been in her home. Lake has threatened litigation against both Stevens and outlets that pursued the story.

Endorsement of Jarrin Jackson 
Lake endorsed Jarrin Jackson, a far-right online streamer, in his campaign for State Oklahoma Senate. Jackson was subsequently scrutinized for his past record of making antisemitic comments, including claims that "the Jews" are evidence that "evil exists"; "Jews will go to hell"; and "Jews [are] taking over the world." These prompted groups such as Jewish Community Relations Council of Greater Phoenix to call on Lake – and other Arizona Republicans who endorsed Jackson – to rescind their endorsements. Lake denounced Jackson's comments and said, "I looked at Jarrin's resume as (a) Combat Veteran in Afghanistan. It is impossible to dig into everything someone has said in their life. If his reported comments are true, I obviously rescind my endorsement."

Envelopes investigation 
On November 7, 2022, Lake's campaign stated that on November 6, a campaign staffer "opened an envelope delivered to our campaign office that contained suspicious white powder. It was one of two envelopes that were confiscated by law enforcement" for testing. On November 11, the Phoenix Police Department said that the Arizona state laboratory had tested the items turned over to them by Lake's campaign, and found "no substance" inside. After this revelation, Lake's campaign stated that there actually had been three envelopes, with the first envelope being opened by the staffer having "a white powdery substance along with a hateful letter", but that the staffer threw the first envelope away, and that the trash was emptied before police were informed, with police being handed the other two envelopes.

Election loss and refusal to concede 

In October 2022, Lake twice refused to say that she will accept the result if she lost the election: "I'm going to win the election, and I will accept that result."

Multiple media outlets projected on November 14, 2022, that Lake had lost the gubernatorial election to Hobbs. Lake's reaction to this was tweeting that "Arizonans know BS when they see it." On November 17, Lake still refused to concede her loss, and announced she was assembling a legal team to challenge the results. Vote counting ended on November 21. 

Arizona's election results were certified on December 5, with Lake losing to Hobbs by a margin of over 17,000 votes: Lake received 1,270,774 votes, while Hobbs received 1,287,891 votes. A January 2023 analysis by a trio of election data experts, collectively known as the Audit Guys, concluded that in Maricopa County, over 33,000 voters who voted Republican in down-ballot races chose to vote for Hobbs instead of Lake, while nearly 6,000 Republican leaning voters did not vote in the gubernatorial election or wrote in another candidate instead of Lake; together, these voters could have flipped the result of the election had they voted for Lake. Conversely, the analysis found that Lake received less than 6,000 voters from Democrat-leaning voters in Maricopa County. Meanwhile, the Associated Press reported in February 2023 that its survey of over 3,200 voters estimated that 11% of Arizona Republicans had voted for Hobbs, while 4% of Arizona Democrats voted for Lake.

Lake alleged voter disfranchisement due to ballot printing problems and long waiting lines in Maricopa County, which had elections run by local Republican officials. In 70 out of 223 Maricopa County polling sites, voting machine ballots were printed too lightly to be read by tabulators; the problem was caused by a printer setting which had not shown widespread issues during prior testing. If voters did not want to wait in line for the issue to be fixed, they could leave to vote at another Maricopa County polling site, with wait times for polling sites being shown online, and many polling sites had little to no waiting lines, stated Maricopa County election officials. Alternatively, voters could drop their ballots into a secure box ("Box 3"), with these ballots being later tabulated at Maricopa County's elections headquarters, under monitoring from observers from both parties; ultimately, around 17,000 Maricopa County ballots were dropped into Box 3. The Arizona secretary of state's office spokesperson said that "Every voter who went to one of the voting locations affected was still able to cast their ballot", and voting rights experts agreed.

Bill Gates, the Republican chair of Maricopa's Board of Supervisors, partially blamed the long lines on Arizona Republican Party chairwoman Kelli Ward for discouraging voters from using Box 3; she had claimed that Box 3 should not be used as "Maricopa County is not turning on their tabulators downtown today". Lake herself told her supporters to stay in line to vote, while a lawyer for Lake's campaign assuaged concerns about using Box 3 to vote. Lake's campaign filed a lawsuit on Election Day to extend voting for another three hours, but Maricopa County Superior Court Judge Tim Ryan declined to do so, stating: "The court doesn't have any evidence that any voter was precluded from their right to vote".

While Lake alleged that Republican-dominated areas in Maricopa County were disproportionately affected by the printing problems, The Washington Post found that the percentage of registered Republicans in affected precincts (37%) was very close to the percentage of registered Republicans across Maricopa County (35%), and also found that some Democrat-dominated areas also faced the printing problems. Meanwhile, The New York Times analyzed 45 claims of irregularities reported by voters, finding that in 34 of these 45 claims, the voters were able to cast their vote despite an inconvenience; while for the others, three raised problems with voter registration; seven gave unclear accounts as to what exactly happened; and only one said she had been denied the opportunity to vote, though she acknowledged she had arrived at her polling place at the time it closed. On December 18, 2022, Lake continued to refuse to concede at a Turning Point USA event, calling for the arrest of Maricopa County election officials and saying "I identify as a proud election denying deplorable. My pronouns are: I won."

Hobbs was sworn in as governor on January 2, 2023. Later in January 2023, Lake posted on Twitter 16 voter signatures, mostly from 2020, suggesting that these were from illegal ballots because the signatures did not match. She also posted a false claim that almost 250,000 voting attempts failed during the 2022 Arizona elections, without proving that the votes were not counted; during the elections, votes that could not be initially scanned were later counted at another location.

Lake's campaign has raised $2.6 million from Election Day until the end of 2022, while taking in even more money from a non-profit fundraising group started by Lake's advisers in December 2022; this group became Lake's main fundraising outlet by February 2023, and is not required to publish donation details. The Arizona Mirror found in January 2023 that less than 10% of the funds raised by Lake after the election were paid to lawyers, despite Lake claiming that the funds were meant for contesting election results.

Election lawsuits 

In April 2022, Lake and Mark Finchem sued state officials, seeking to ban electronic voting machines from being used in her 2022 election. In August 2022, U.S. District Judge John Tuchi dismissed the suit, writing that Lake and Finchem "articulated only conjectural allegations of potential injuries" and thus lacked standing. In his ruling, Tuchi also cited the Eleventh Amendment to the United States Constitution, as well as the Purcell principle. In December 2022, Tuchi sanctioned Lake's lawyers in this suit, including Alan Dershowitz, for making "false, misleading, and unsupported" assertions during the case, and making claims without "an  adequate factual or legal basis grounded in a reasonable pre-filing inquiry"; he ordered the plaintiffs to pay the defendants' attorney fees. Tuchi said the sanctions would show that the court does not tolerate litigants "furthering false narratives that baselessly undermine public trust at a time of increasing disinformation about, and distrust in, the democratic process".

On December 9, after Arizona certified the election, Lake filed a new suit, seeking a court order to either overturn Hobbs' victory and declare Lake as the winner of the election, or redo the election in Maricopa County. Lake's complaint alleged that there were hundreds of thousands of illegal votes in the election, but provided no evidence in support of these claims. On December 19, Maricopa County Superior Court Judge Peter Thompson, who was appointed by Republican Governor Jan Brewer, dismissed eight of ten counts of Lake's lawsuit, regarding invalid signatures on mail-in ballots, incorrect certification, inadequate remedy, as well as violations of freedom of speech, equal protection, due process, the secrecy clause, and constitutional rights. The judge allowed the remaining two counts to go to trial, these being allegations that election officials intentionally interfered with Maricopa County ballot printers and with the chain of custody of Maricopa County ballots. The judge ruled that Lake needed to prove during the trial that the above allegations were true, and that the alleged actions "did in fact result in a changed outcome" of the election.

Lake's reaction to Judge Thompson's initial ruling was declaring: "Arizona, We will have our day in court!" During the two-day trial, Northrop Grumman information security officer Clay Parikh, a witness called by Lake, testified that some ballots had printing errors that would cause tabulation issues, but also testified that these misprinted ballots would ultimately be counted after duplicates were made. On December 24, Judge Thompson dismissed Lake's remaining case, as the court did not find clear and convincing evidence that misconduct was committed. The judge wrote: "Every single witness before the Court disclaimed any personal knowledge of such [intentional] misconduct. The Court cannot accept speculation or conjecture in place of clear and convincing evidence". The judge further ruled that "printer failures did not actually affect the results of the election", while highlighting that one witness called by Lake testified that "printer failures were largely the result of unforeseen mechanical failure."

A day after the ruling was issued, a tweet was posted on Lake's Twitter page which stated: "The Dismissal of Kari Lake's Election Lawsuit Shows Voter Disenfranchisement No Longer Matters @Rach_IC: 'Legal experts believe his decision [by Judge Thompson] was ghostwritten, they suspect top left-wing attorneys like Marc Elias emailed him what to say'." The tweet linked to an article from Townhall which had made the claim; the article provided no evidence for this claim, and does not cite which legal experts have this belief. The tweet was deleted by the next day.

On December 27, Judge Thompson ordered Lake to pay Hobbs for $33,000 of fees for expert witnesses and a ballot inspector due to the lawsuit, but did not sanction Lake for filing the lawsuit. Hours later, Lake made an appeal to the Arizona Court of Appeals, against the judge's ruling on all counts of her lawsuit and on fees owed to Hobbs. 

A three-judge panel for the appeals court affirmed Thompson's ruling on February 16, 2023; chief judge Kent Cattani wrote the opinion and two other judges, Maria Elena Cruz and Peter Swann, concurred. The appeals court found that "Lake’s only purported evidence" that long lines at voting centres "had any potential effect on election results was, quite simply, sheer speculation." The appeals court noted that "Lake presented no evidence that voters whose ballots were unreadable by on-site tabulators were not able to vote", while highlighting that Lake's own cybersecurity expert testified to the contrary. In summary, the appeals court wrote that the evidence presented in court showed that "voters were able to cast their ballots, that votes were counted correctly and that no other basis justifies setting aside the election results". 

Lake filed an appeal to the Arizona Supreme Court on March 1, 2023.

Personal life
Lake has been married to Jeff Halperin since August 1998. She was previously married to Tracy Finnegan, an electrical engineer. She previously identified as a Buddhist before 2015 according to her friends, but as of 2022, she identified as a Christian. Lake has described her Christian faith and the church she attends as evangelical.

References

External links
 
 
 
 

1969 births
Living people
20th-century American journalists
21st-century American journalists
21st-century evangelicals
American television news anchors
American women television presenters
Arizona Republicans
Candidates in the 2022 United States elections
Christians from Arizona
Converts to Christianity from Buddhism
Journalists from Illinois
Journalists from Iowa
People from Rock Island, Illinois
University of Iowa alumni